This is a list of members of the National Parliament of Papua New Guinea from 1997 to 2002, as elected at the 1997 election.

Notes

References

List
Papua New Guinea politics-related lists